Aiadava (Aiadaba or Aeadaba) was a Dacian town in the Remesiana region, present day Bela Palanka, Serbia.

After the Romans conquered Moesia in the 75 BC, the new castrum (imperial domain with estates) and municipium was known initially as Ulpianorum and then Remesiana (Moesi) and laid on the Via Militaris road, between Naissus and Serdica.

Emperor Justinian (r. 527–565) had following strongholds in the district of Remesiana:

The patron saint of Romania, Nicetas of Remesiana, was a 4th-century bishop at Remesiana, of possible Dacian descent.

Excavations include well-preserved castrum dating to 4th century, a hoard of 260 coins minted during the rule of Constantine I, Theodosius I, Tiberius Claudius Nero.

See also
Dacia
List of ancient cities in Thrace and Dacia
Archaeological Sites of Great Importance (Serbia)
Remesiana

References

External links 

Sorin Olteanu's Project: Linguae Thraco-Daco-Moesorum – Toponyms Section

Ancient cities in Serbia
Moesia
Dacian towns
Roman towns and cities in Serbia
Former populated places in Serbia